Events in the year 1989 in Pakistan.

Incumbents

Federal government 

President: Ghulam Ishaq Khan 
Prime Minister: Benazir Bhutto
Chief Justice: Mohammad Haleem (until 31 December)

Governors 

Governor of Balochistan – Musa Khan 
Governor of Khyber Pakhtunkhwa – Amir Gulistan Janjua 
Governor of Punjab – Tikka Khan 
Governor of Sindh – Qadeeruddin Ahmed (until 19 April); Fakhruddin G. Ebrahim (starting 19 April)

Events 

 20 October–27 October – The South Asian Games take place in Islamabad.
 Pakistan announces the successful test firing of the Hatf-1 and Hatf-2 missiles.
 The science-fiction film Shaani is released.
 Pakistan returns to its status as a Commonwealth republic, having been outside the Commonwealth of Nations since January 1972.

Deaths

 Brigadier Tariq Mehmood: 29 May 1989

See also

1988 in Pakistan
Other events of 1989
1990 in Pakistan
Timeline of Pakistani history

References

 
1989 in Asia